Dichomeris davisi is a moth in the family Gelechiidae. It was described by Kyu-Tek Park and Ronald W. Hodges in 1995. It is found in Sri Lanka, China (Hong Kong) and Taiwan.

The wingspan is 10–12 mm. The forewings are brownish orange, with dark brown scales in the basal area. There is an elongate dark brown costal blotch, meeting the postmedial line. This line consists of three narrow lines, beyond this yellowish white edged by a dark brown patch. There is a yellowish white line extending from before the apex to the tornus. The hindwings are dark grey.

Etymology
The species is named for Dr. Don R. Davis.

References

Moths described in 1995
davisi